The Korea Veterans Association of Canada erected a Wall of Remembrance to the 516 Canadians who are commemorated in the Korean War Book of Remembrance.

The Wall was dedicated on July 27, 1997 and is located at Brampton, Ontario's Meadowvale Cemetery. The Korea veterans who were present for the unveiling, marched to the site to pay homage to their fallen comrades. The Wall of Remembrance is about 200-feet long, two-feet high and curves on a slope with plaques of the names of those who died. Together 26,791 Canadians served in the Korea War and approximately 7,000 continued to serve in the theatre between the ceasefire and the end of 1955.

The idea of a Wall of Remembrance came about when two members of Unit 57 of Korea Veterans Association (K.V.A.) were gathering information about a specific comrade who had been killed in Korea and a member of the family requested a picture of the comrades' grave in Pusan. The family were more than delighted to obtain a picture and it was then that the President, Bill Allan, came up with the concept of a Wall of Remembrance.

He solicited the support of the Secretary of the Unit and Past Presidents George Mannion, David Barker and members of Unit 57. They developed the plan, initiating meetings between the Corporation of Meadowvale Cemeteries and several government agencies to build the Wall of Remembrance. The committee raised $300,000.00 from the private sector.

The Wall of Remembrance (the Wall) was constructed of gray Barre granite, which matched the existing Veterans' Memorial. Approximately 200 feet in length, the Wall curves gently to follow the roadway which circles around the Veterans' Memorial. A low-profile retaining wall approximately two feet high, the Wall follows the natural topography which slopes gently towards the roadway. The Wall leans backwards at an angle of approximately 50 degrees.

The central feature of the Wall consists of three panels: a rectangular block flanked by two wings which slope down from the centre. They are four feet wide and approximately five feet high at the highest point. The rectangular block in the centre features the Korean Veterans Association insignia, the Canadian forces insignia, the United Nations insignia, and the names of the participating Canadian Forces.

On one wing is a poem by Jack LaChance, on the other, a verse from Laurence Binyon's famous poem "For the Fallen", information relating to the dedication of the memorial, and the names of the organizing committee responsible for getting this project off the ground.

The memorial, itself, consists of seven sections on each side of the central feature. Each section contains four rows of 6" X 10" bronze plaques, which are replicas of those gracing the graves of the comrades in Pusan.

See also
 Korean War Memorial, Canberra, Australia
 Korean War Veterans Memorial, Washington, D.C.
 Philadelphia Korean War Memorial
 United Nations Memorial Cemetery, in Pusan, Korea, where many Canadian war dead are buried
 War Memorial of Korea, Seoul, Korea

References

 Korea Veterans Association of Canada Gives the story of the wall.
 Test of Will is a Canadian documentary by Richard Neilson  in 2002 that covers the story of the Canadian involvement in the Korean War. The end of the documentary profiles the Korean War Memorial Wall and interviews Bill Allan who spearheaded the effort to build the wall

Canadian military memorials and cemeteries
Buildings and structures in Brampton
Monuments and memorials in Ontario
Korean War memorials and cemeteries
Tourist attractions in Brampton